Dragomirov (Russian:Драгомиров) is a surname. Notable people with the surname include:

 Abram Dragomirov (1868–1955), Russian general
 Mikhail Dragomirov (1830–1905), Russian general
 Vladimir Dragomirov (1867–1928), Russian general

Fictional
 Natalia Dragomiroff, princess and character in Murder on the Orient Express

Russian-language surnames